Jacob Gershon-Cohen (January 9, 1899 in Philadelphia - February 6, 1971 in Philadelphia) was an American researcher and physician, known for the use of mammography for the early detection of breast cancer.

Biography  
Gershon-Cohen was born in Philadelphia to Jewish immigrant parents. He was director of radiology at the Albert Einstein Medical Center, professor of radiology at the University of Pennsylvania, and Professor of Research Radiology at Temple University.

in 1964, he developed mammography to detect breast cancer, which has been a significant step for more effective treatment of the disease.
He is also known for the development of thermography.

Gershon-Cohen published more than 400 scientific works during his career.

References

1899 births
1971 deaths
American scientists
Jewish American scientists
American inventors
20th-century American Jews